UAAP Season 69 was the 2006–07 season of the University Athletic Association of the Philippines.
The University of the East was the season host with the theme “Achieving Excellence in Sports Through Unity, Harmony and Commitment.” The season started with basketball competition on July 8, 2006 at the Araneta Coliseum.

Basketball

Men's tournament

Elimination round

Tiebreaker: UST defeats Adamson on the playoff for the 3rd seed, 85-71.

Playoffs

Awardees

Women's tournament

Elimination round

Tiebreakers:
UST clinched the #1 seed and the twice to beat advantage at the semifinals with a better points difference (+35) against FEU (–13) and Ateneo (–22)
FEU defeated Ateneo on the playoff for the 2nd seed, 49–48.

Playoffs
With UST, FEU and Ateneo tied on the first spot, the points difference system was used - UST emerged with the highest quotient, so FEU and Ateneo figured in a classification game to determine which team gets the twice to beat advantage in the semifinals. FEU won the game, 49–48.

Awardees

Juniors' tournament

Elimination round

Playoffs
With Ateneo's 12–0 sweep of the elimination round, the step ladder format will be used. After finishing 3rd and 4th in the elimination round, Adamson and UPIS will face for the right to face FEU-FERN in the next round in a twice-to-win disadvantage. Whoever wins in the semifinals between the winner of the knockout game and FEU-FERN will emerge into the Finals with Ateneo in a best of three series.

This would be the FEU-FERN Baby Tamaraws' first Finals appearance.

Awardees

Volleyball

Four championships are disputed; men's, women's, boys' and girls'.

Men's tournament

Elimination round

Playoffs

Awards

Women's tournament

Elimination round

Playoffs

Awards

Football

Men's division

Elimination round

Final

Softball

The UAAP Season 69 softball tournament fields five teams with the Adamson Lady Falcons as the defending champions. Games are held in University of Santo Tomas (UST) Open Field.

Team standings

Match-up results

Playoffs

Fencing
Two championships are disputed; men's and women's. The following results are final.
Host team in boldface.

Men's tournament

Awardees
Most Valuable Player:  Bonifacio Jacinto (UE)
Rookie of the Year:   Harris Orendain (UST)

Women's tournament

Awardees
Most Valuable Player:  Victoria Garcia (ADMU)
Rookie of the Year:   Lafayette Garcia (ADMU)

Chess
Three titles were disputed for the UAAP Chess Championship.
Host team in boldface. The results below are final.

Men's tournament

Women's tournament

Juniors' tournament

Taekwondo
Three titles were disputed for the UAAP Taekwondo Championship.

Judo

Men's tournament

Awardees
Most Valuable Player:  Stephen Gerena (UST)
Rookie of the Year:  Salvador S. Reyes, Jr. (Ateneo)

Women's tournament

Awardees
Most Valuable Player:  Mellisa Buyco (UP)
Rookie of the Year:   Leslyn Gonzales (UP)

Juniors' tournament
Juniors' judo was played as a demonstration sport.

Swimming

The UAAP Season 69 Swimming Championships were held from September 21 to September 24, 2006 at the Rizal Memorial Swimming Center at Vito Cruz St., Malate, Manila. Four titles were disputed in the four-division tournament.

Team ranking is determined by a point system, similar to that of the overall championship. The points given are based on the swimmer's/team's finish in the finals of an event, which include only the top eight finishers from the preliminaries. The gold medalist(s) receive 15 points, silver gets 12, bronze has 10. The following points: 8, 6, 4, 2 and 1 are given to the rest of the participating swimmers/teams according to their order of finish.

Men's tournament

Host team in boldface - Data incomplete

Awardees
Most Valuable Player:  Louie Francis Marquez (UST)
Rookie of the Year:   Ryan Paolo Arabejo (UP)
UP repeated a four-peat they last did during the 1996-2000 seasons.

Women's tournament

Host team in boldface - Data incomplete

Awardees
Most Valuable Player:  Luica Gaudes Dacanay (UP)
Rookie of the Year:   Heidi Gem Ong (ADMU)
 UPIS took home their first ever crown.

Boys' tournament

Host team in boldface - Data incomplete

Awardees
Most Valuable Player:
Rookie of the Year:

Girls' tournament

Host team in boldface - Data incomplete

Awardees
Most Valuable Player:
Rookie of the Year:

Track and field (Athletics)
Three titles were disputed for the UAAP Track and Field.

Cheerdance competition

The Cheerdance Competition was held on September 10, 2006 at the Araneta Coliseum. Cheer dance competition is an exhibition event. Points for the general championship are not awarded to the participants

The UST Salinggawi Dance Troupe clinched their eight UAAP cheerdance title via 5 consecutive wins, with FEU improving to second place, and UP falling to third place.

The Cheerdance Competition is not counted on the tabulation of the Overall Championship.

Broadcast notes
ABS-CBN affiliates Studio 23 and The Filipino Channel broadcast the basketball playoffs series and selected elimination round games. The broadcast crew included Boom Gonzales, Ronnie Magsanoc, Sev Sarmienta and Ryan Gregorio, among others,  and the courtside reporters from the participating schools.

Studio 23 also broadcast selected elimination games of women's volleyball starting January 14 (start of second round), and playoffs series in both men's and women's volleyball.

General championship summary 
The general champion is determined by a point system. The system gives 15 points to the champion team of a UAAP event, 12 to the runner-up, and 10 to the third placer. The following points: 8, 6, 4, 2 and 1 are given to the rest of the participating teams according to their order of finish.

Medals table

Seniors' division

Juniors' division

General championship tally

Seniors' division

Juniors' division

Individual awards
Athletes of the Year:
 Seniors': 
 Juniors':

See also
 2006 UST Growling Tigers men's basketball team
 NCAA Season 82

References

External links
 Official UAAP website
 UAAP Basketball at UBelt.com: Men's | Women's | Juniors'
 

 
2006 in Philippine sport
2007 in Philippine sport
2007 in multi-sport events
69